Perimysium is a sheath of connective tissue that groups muscle fibers into bundles (anywhere between 10 and 100 or more) or fascicles.

Studies of muscle physiology suggest that the perimysium plays a role in transmitting lateral contractile movements. This hypothesis is strongly supported in one exhibition of the existence of "perimysial junctional plates" in ungulate flexor carpi radialis muscles constructed by Emilie Passerieux. The overall comprehensive organization of the perimysium collagen network, as well as its continuity and disparateness, however, have still not been observed and described thoroughly everywhere within the muscle. Found to have type I, III, VI, and XII collagen.

See also
Connective tissue in skeletal muscle
Endomysium
Epimysium

References

External links

Histology at cytochemistry.net

Soft tissue
Muscular system